William Walter "Billy" Wilkins (born 1942) is a former United States circuit judge of the United States Court of Appeals for the Fourth Circuit and a former United States District Judge of the United States District Court for the District of South Carolina.

Education and career

Born in Anderson, South Carolina, Wilkins received a Bachelor of Arts degree from Davidson College in 1964 and a Juris Doctor from the University of South Carolina Law School in 1967. He served on active duty for two years, in active reserves, and the South Carolina National Guard for twenty-five years. He holds the retired rank of Brigadier General. He was a law clerk to then chief judge, Clement Haynsworth, of the United States Court of Appeals for the Fourth Circuit from 1969 to 1970. He was a legal assistant to United States Senator Strom Thurmond from 1970 to 1971. He was in private practice in Greenville, South Carolina from 1971 to 1978, also serving as the Solicitor (District Attorney) of the Thirteenth Judicial Circuit, South Carolina from 1974 to 1981.

Federal judicial service

Wilkins was nominated by President Ronald Reagan on July 9, 1981, to a seat on the United States District Court for the District of South Carolina vacated by Judge Robert W. Hemphill. He was confirmed by the United States Senate on July 20, 1981, and received commission on July 22, 1981. He was Reagan's first appointment to the federal bench. His service terminated on July 10, 1986, due to his elevation to the Fourth Circuit.

He served as Chair of the United States Sentencing Commission from 1985 to 1994.

Wilkins was nominated by President Reagan on June 3, 1986, to a seat on the United States Court of Appeals for the Fourth Circuit vacated by Judge Emory M. Sneeden. He was confirmed by the Senate on June 13, 1986, and received commission on June 16, 1986. He served as Chief Judge from 2003 to 2007. He assumed senior status on July 1, 2007. His service terminated on October 5, 2008, due to retirement.

Post judicial service

He presently leads Nexsen Pruet law firm's Appellate Advocacy, Corporate Compliance / Crisis Management, and White Collar Crime practices and is active with the firm's business litigation practice.

References

External links

 
 

1942 births
Living people
Chairpersons of the United States Sentencing Commission
Davidson College alumni
Judges of the United States Court of Appeals for the Fourth Circuit
Judges of the United States District Court for the District of South Carolina
Members of the United States Sentencing Commission
South Carolina Republicans
United States Army generals
United States court of appeals judges appointed by Ronald Reagan
United States district court judges appointed by Ronald Reagan
20th-century American judges
University of South Carolina alumni